The World Dodgeball Federation, also known as WDBF, is the world governing body for the sport of dodgeball. Amongst its responsibilities are to run the Dodgeball World Championship since 2012.

History
Formed in 2011, the organisation sought to unite different continents into one federation. In 2012, the first Dodgeball World Championship was held in Kuala Lumpur.

In 2021, WDBF's membership reached 80 members, all also members of the relevant continental federations.

While earlier editions of the Dodgeball World Championship only included foam, starting with 2022, a cloth category was created.

Responsibilities
WDBF is responsible for organising the Dodgeball World Championship. It was initially an open event, but stopped being an open event as the membership grew, and now works by qualification.

See also
World Dodgeball Association

References

International sports organizations
Dodgeball